For the state pageant affiliated with Miss Teen USA, see Miss North Carolina Teen USA
 
The Miss North Carolina's Outstanding Teen competition is the pageant that selects the representative for the U.S. state of North Carolina in the Miss America's Outstanding Teen pageant.

Kerrigan Brown of Spivey's Corner was crowned Miss North Carolina's Outstanding Teen on June 25, 2022 at the High Point Theater in High Point, North Carolina. She competed for the title of Miss America's Outstanding Teen 2023 at the Hyatt Regency Dallas in Dallas, Texas on August 12, 2022.

Results summary 
The following is a visual summary of the past results of Miss North Carolina's Outstanding Teen titleholders presented in the table below. The year in parentheses indicates year of the Miss America's Outstanding Teen competition in which the placement and/or award was garnered.

Placements 

 1st runners-up: Catherine White (2017)
 3rd runners-up: Katherine Puryear (2010)
 Top 8: Emili McPhail (2014)
 Top 15: McKenzie Faggart (2012)

Awards

Preliminary awards 
 Preliminary Evening Wear/On-Stage Question: Catherine White (2017)

Other awards 
 America's Choice: McKenzie Faggart (2012)
 Outstanding Achievement in Academic Life Award: Emili McPhail (2014)
 Outstanding Instrumental Talent Award: Emili McPhail (2014)
 Scholastic Excellence Award: Karson Fair (2015)

Winners

References

External links
 Official website

North Carolina
North Carolina culture
Women in North Carolina
Annual events in North Carolina